Ernesto Matteo Poggi, known as Gino Poggi or Poggi II (23 February 1913 -  3 January 1992), was an Italian footballer and coach of the 1950s.

Biography 

He then played six seasons at Ginnastica Sampierdarenese, and in 1934, won Serie B. With two seasons at Milan AC where he won nothing, he moved to la Fiorentina, where in the first year, he won Serie B in 1939, and in the second, won the Italian Cup, beating Genoa in the final. He played there until 1943.

He moved clubs in 1945, due to the Second World War, for one season, to Società Ginnastica Andrea Doria, without success. He retired at Sampdoria in 1947.

He became a football manager in the 1950s. He had two spells (50-51 and 52-53) at U.C. Sampdoria, as well as at Calcio Catania for three seasons (55-58), Genoa CFC (59-60) and AC Cesena (61-62). He never won a title as a coach.

Clubs

As player 
 1928-1929 : Associazione Calcio La Dominante
 1929-1930 : Genoa CFC
 1930-1936 : Ginnastica Sampierdarenese
 1936-1938 : Milan AC
 1938-1943 : AC Fiorentina
 1945-1946 : Società Ginnastica Andrea Doria
 1946-1947 : U.C. Sampdoria

As coach 
 1950-1951 : U.C. Sampdoria
 1952-1953 : U.C. Sampdoria
 1955-1958 : Calcio Catania
 1959-1960 : Genoa CFC
 1961-1962 : AC Cesena

Honours 
Coppa Italia
Winner in 1940
Serie A
Runner-up in 1930
Serie B
Champion in 1934 and 1939

Footballers from Genoa
Italian footballers
Serie A players
Serie B players
Genoa C.F.C. players
A.C. Milan players
ACF Fiorentina players
U.C. Sampdoria players
Italian football managers
1913 births
1992 deaths

Association football midfielders